This is a list of foreign players (players from outside of the island of Ireland) to have played for League of Ireland clubs.

Only players not from the Republic of Ireland, Northern Ireland are eligible for this list.

Africa (CAF)

Algeria
 Wassim Aouachria – Waterford

Angola
 Manuel Kaguako – Dundalk, Drogheda United
 José Quitongo – Waterford
 Rudy – Waterford

Benin
 Romuald Boco – Sligo Rovers

Burundi
 Aime Kitenge – St Patrick's Athletic

Cameroon
 Joseph N'Do – St Patrick's Athletic, Shelbourne, Shamrock Rovers, Bohemians, Sligo Rovers, Limerick
 Maxim Kouogun – UCD, Waterford, Shelbourne
 George Mukete – Athlone Town

Cape Verde
 Roberto Lopes – Bohemians, Shamrock Rovers

Central African Republic
 Wilfried Zahibo – Dundalk

Congo
 Gaius Makouta – Longford Town

DR Congo
 Serge Atakayi – St Patrick's Athletic
 Patrick Kanyuka – Limerick
 Chris Lotefa – Bohemians
 Christian Lotefa – Cabinteely, Athlone Town
 Lido Lotefa – Dundalk, Longford Town
 Paul Matondo – Drogheda United
 Harlain Mbayo – Cobh Ramblers
 Patrick Nzuzi – Limerick, Sligo Rovers

Equatorial Guinea
 Baba Issaka – Kildare County, Athlone Town

Ghana
 Ali Abbas – Limerick
 Prince Agyemang – Limerick

Guinea Bissau
 Junior Quitirna – Waterford

Ivory Cost
 Moussa Bakayoko – Derry City

Kenya
 Jonah Ayunga – Sligo Rovers, Galway United
 Henry Ochieng – Cork City

Liberia
 George Miller – St Patrick's Athletic
 Garmondeh Ta-Uway – Athlone Town

Libya
 Muhanned Bukhatwa – Shamrock Rovers B
 Éamon Zayed – Bray Wanderers, Drogheda United, Sporting Fingal, Derry City, Shamrock Rovers, Sligo Rovers

Madagascar
 Bastien Héry – Limerick, Waterford, Bohemians, Derry City, Finn Harps, Galway United

Morocco
 Sami Ben Amar – Dundalk
 Samir Boughanem – Shamrock Rovers
 Khalid El Khaliffi – Sligo Rovers

Niger
 Karim El-Khebir – St Patrick's Athletic

Nigeria
 Ola Adeyemo – UCD, Wexford
 Ismahil Akinade – Bray Wanderers, Bohemians, Waterford
 Victor Arong – Drogheda United
 Victor Ekanem – Longford Town, Drogheda United, Cabinteely, Athlone Town
 Efan Ekoku – Dublin City
 Willie Enubele – Galway United
 James Igwilo – Shelbourne
 Dominic Iorfa – Cork City, Waterford
 Oladapo Kayode – Derry City
 Tzee Mustapha – St Patrick's Athletic, Athlone Town, Waterford United
 Michael Nwankwo – Cork City
 Nathan Oduwa – Dundalk
 Jason Oladele – Longford Town
 Promise Omochere – Bohemians
 Emeka Onwubiko – Bray Wanderers, Athlone Town, Shamrock Rovers B
 Michael Osobe – Dundalk
 Ajibula Sule – Shelbourne, Cabinteely
 Fuad Sule – St Patrick's Athletic, Bohemians
 Marco Tagbajumi – Dundalk

Senegal
 Ibrahima Thiam – Drogheda United

Sierra Leone
 Mamoud Mansaray – Athlone Town

Somalia
 Haji Abdikadir – Athlone Town

South Africa
 BJ Banda – Finn Harps
 Owen Da Gama – Derry City
 Katlego Mashigo – Waterford, Athlone Town, Finn Harps
 Reyaad Pieterse – Shamrock Rovers
 Tumelo Tlou – Longford Town, Athlone Town
 Carlton Ubaezuono – Dundalk, Galway United, Longford Town

Togo
 Moise Assogba – Galway United
 Cyril Guedjé – St Patrick's Athletic, Limerick

Tunisia
 Ayman Ben Mohamed – UCD, Longford Town, Bohemians

Uganda
 Melvyn Lorenzen – Sligo Rovers
 Charles Livingstone Mbabazi – St Patrick's Athletic

Zaire
 José Mukendi – Derry City, Finn Harps

Zimbabwe
 Nathaniel Gumbo – Cobh Ramblers
 Henry McKop – Shelbourne
 Prince Mutswunguma – Waterford
 Oscar Sibanda – Galway United

Asia (AFC)

Australia
 Tomislav Arčaba – Sligo Rovers
 Harry Ascroft - Finn Harps
 Dimitri Brinias – Galway United
 Sean Eve – Wexford
 Adam Hughes – Sligo Rovers, Drogheda United
 Brad Jones – Shelbourne
 Robert Markovac – Waterford United
 Liam McGing – Finn Harps
 James Meredith – Sligo Rovers
 Dylan Mernagh – Waterford United
 Chris O'Connor – Bray Wanderers, Bohemians
 Andrew Packer – Cork City
 Andy Petterson – Derry City
 Stevan Stanic-Floody – Drogheda United
 John Tambouras – Drogheda United

Guam
 Ryan Guy – St Patrick's Athletic

Hong Kong
 John Moore – St Patrick's Athletic
 David Williamson – Sligo Rovers, Bohemians, Bray Wanderers

Iraq
 Zein Albehadlie – Bohemians

Japan
 Kaito Akimoto – Cabinteely
 Ryusei Kojima – Cabinteely
 Yuta Sasaki – Cabinteely
 Hisanori Takada – Drogheda United

Jordan
 Jaime Siaj – Finn Harps

South Korea
 Jeongwoo Han – Dundalk
 Jingu Kim – Galway United
 Yob Son – Galway United
 Lee-Cheol Sung – Athlone Town

Europe (UEFA)

Albania
 Alessio Abibi – Dundalk
 Alban Hysa – Monaghan United, Dublin City
 Marlon Marishta – Bohemians, Bray Wanderers

Austria
 Tobias Kainz – Limerick
 Maximilian Karner – Derry City
 Alexander Kogler – Finn Harps
 Lukas Schubert – Derry City
 Orhan Vojic - Shamrock Rovers

Belgium
 Axel Bossekota – Limerick
 Stanley Aborah – Waterford
 Faysel Kasmi – Waterford
 Danny Lupano– Derry City
 Tunde Owolabi – Finn Harps, St Patrick's Athletic, Cork City
 Dominique Wouters – Waterford United, St Patrick's Athletic

Bosnia and Herzegovina
 Fahrudin Kuduzović – Sligo Rovers, Drogheda United, Cork City, Dundalk
 Admir Softić – Cork City

Bulgaria
 Yani Georgiev – Bray Wanderers
 Vladislav Velikin – Athlone Town

Croatia
 David Bosnjak – Cobh Ramblers
 Filip Mihaljević – Finn Harps
 Trpimir Vrljičak – Kerry

Czech Republic
 Vítězslav Jaroš – St Patrick's Athletic
 Michal Macek – St Patrick's Athletic

Denmark
 Morten Nielsen – Sligo Rovers
 Jesper Jørgensen – Galway United
 Jonas Piechnik – Cork City
 Niclas Vemmelund – Derry City, Dundalk

England
 Chris Adamson – St Patrick's Athletic
 Tobi Adebayo-Rowling – Sligo Rovers, Cork City
 Elicha Ahui – Drogheda United
 James Akintunde – Derry City, Bohemians
 Sam Allardyce – Limerick
 Joseph Anang – St Patrick's Athletic
 Nigel Aris – Waterford
 Chris Armstrong – St Patrick's Athletic, Galway United
 Drew Baker – Bohemians
 Gordon Banks – St Patrick's Athletic
 Lewis Banks – Sligo Rovers
 Alex Baptiste – Waterford
 Keith Barker – St Patrick's Athletic
 Peter Barnes – Drogheda United
 Shane Barrett – Drogheda United, Sporting Fingal, Cork City, Monaghan United
 Guy Bates – Drogheda United
 Jack Baxter – Cork City
 Ashley Bayes – Bohemians
 Darren Beasley – Drogheda United
 Paul Beavers – Shelbourne
 Mitchell Beeney – Sligo Rovers
 Jay Benn – Bohemians
 Dean Bennett – Dundalk
 Neil Bennett – Drogheda United, Derry City
 Richard Blackmore – Dundalk, Galway United
 Matthew Blinkhorn – Sligo Rovers
 Sam Bone – Shamrock Rovers, Waterford, St Patrick's Athletic, Dundalk
 Rob Bowman – Bohemians
 Leon Braithwaite – St Patrick's Athletic
 Barry Bridges – St Patrick's Athletic, Sligo Rovers
 Louis Britton – Waterford, Cork City
 Harry Brockbank – St Patrick's Athletic
 Trevor Brooking – Cork City
 Richard Brush – Sligo Rovers, Shamrock Rovers, Finn Harps
 Jack Burkett – St Patrick's Athletic
 Dennis Burnett – Shamrock Rovers
 Charlie Burns – Galway United
 Ian Butterworth – Cobh Ramblers
 Ian Callaghan – Cork United
 Greg Challender – Finn Harps
 Bobby Charlton – Waterford
 Kieran Coates – Cork City
 John Cofie – Derry City
 Gerry Coyne – Limerick, Cork Hibernians
 Craig Curran – Limerick
 Blain Curtis – Finn Harps
 Deshane Dalling – Cork City
 Luke Danville – Dundalk
 Archie Davies – Dundalk
 Dixie Dean – Sligo Rovers
 Adam Dempsey – Wexford, Bray Wanderers
 Sadou Diallo – Derry City
 John Dillon – Sligo Rovers, Dundalk
 Reyon Dillon – Cork City
 Kieran Djilali – Sligo Rovers, Limerick, Cork City
 Alan Dodd – Cork City
 Sean Doherty – Sligo Rovers
 Tom Donaghy – Waterford
 Mark Doninger – Sligo Rovers
 Gareth Downey – Finn Harps, Shelbourne, Monaghan United
 Glen Downey – Shelbourne
 Jack Doyle – Derry City
 Freddie Draper – Drogheda United
 Eddie Dsane – Longford Town, Finn Harps
 Dylan Duncan – Finn Harps
 Robert Dunne – Cabinteely
 Anthony Elding – Sligo Rovers, Cork City, Derry City
 Lee Ellington – Finn Harps
 Kit Elliott – Cork City
 Andy Estel – Home Farm, Drogheda United
 Jake Evans – Waterford
 Ellis Farrar – Finn Harps
 Scott Fenwick – Cork City
 Walter Figueira – Waterford, Derry City, Sligo Rovers
 Neil Fitzhenry – Finn Harps
 Alan Fletcher – Sligo Rovers
 Jordan Flores – Dundalk, Bohemians
 George Forrest – Waterford
 Martin Garratt – St Patrick's Athletic
 Brendan Gallen – Sligo Rovers, Drogheda United
 Steven Gaughan – Cork City
 Jordan Gibson – St Patrick's Athletic, Sligo Rovers
 Kerrea Gilbert – Shamrock Rovers
 Matty Gillam – Cork City
 Matthew Gledhill – Sligo Rovers, Cork City
 Jaanai Gordon – Sligo Rovers
 Matt Gregg – Bray Wanderers, Bohemians, UCD, Dundalk
 Tom Grivosti – St Patrick's Athletic
 Greg Halford – Waterford
 Adam Hammill – Derry City
 Ray Hankin – Shamrock Rovers
 Alf Hanson – Shelbourne
 Allan Harris – St Patrick's Athletic
 Jimmy Harris – St Patrick's Athletic
 Bob Hatton – Dundalk
 Wayne Hatswell – Dundalk
 Omar Haughton – Sligo Rovers
 George Heaven – Cork City
 Max Hemmings – Galway United
 Jeff Henderson – Sligo Rovers
 James Henshall – Shelbourne
 Jak Hickman – St Patrick's Athletic
 Michael Holt – St Patrick's Athletic, Derry City, Dublin City
 Tony Hopper – Bohemians
 Grant Horton – Bohemians
 Michael Howard – Cork City
 Jamie Hughes – Derry City
 Jackson Hulme – Athlone Town
 Paul Hunt – St Patrick's Athletic, Longford Town, Cobh Ramblers, Cork City
 Geoff Hurst – Cork Celtic
 Reece Hutchinson – Sligo Rovers
 Christian Hyslop – Waterford United
 Benny Igiehon – Sligo Rovers, Finn Harps
 Pat Jennings Jr. – UCD, Derry City, Sligo Rovers, Shamrock Rovers, Athlone Town, St Patrick's Athletic
 Daniel Jones – Bray Wanderers, Longford Town
 Jimmy-Lee Jones – St Patrick's Athletic
 Tony Kelly – Sligo Rovers
 Brenton Leister – St Patrick's Athletic
 Alfie Lewis – St Patrick's Athletic, Dundalk
 Andrew Lewis – Bray Wanderers
 Adam Liddle – Derry City
 Will Longbottom – Waterford
 Jason Lydiate – Finn Harps
 Dean Lyness – St Patrick's Athletic
 Niall Maher – Longford Town
 Darren Mansaram – Sligo Rovers, Bohemians, Dundalk
 Paul Marney – St Patrick's Athletic, Dundalk
 Connor Malley – Dundalk
 James Marrow – Finn Harps
 Adam Martin – Bohemians
 Jamie Mascoll – Waterford
 Terry McDermott – Cork City
 Michael McGinlay – Bohemians, Dundalk
 Michael McGrath – Galway United, Sligo Rovers
 Cameron McJannet – Derry City
 Nahum Melvin-Lambert – St Patrick's Athletic
 Jeremie Milambo – Waterford
 Tom Miller – Dundalk
 Lee Molyneaux – Derry City
 Andy Moran – Derry City
 Adam Morgan – Sligo Rovers
 Scott Morgan – Galway United
 Tom Morris – Longford Town
 Dave Morrison – Bohemians
 Hayden Muller – Dundalk
 Peter Mumby – Shamrock Rovers, Limerick
 Danny Murphy – Cork City, Shamrock Rovers
 John Murphy – St Patrick's Athletic
 Dan Murray – Cork City, Shamrock Rovers
 Jordan Mustoe – Finn Harps
 Jennison Myrie-Williams – Sligo Rovers
 Liam Nash – Cork City
 Alex Nesovic – Finn Harps, Bohemians, Dundalk, Shelbourne, Derry City, Dublin City
 Danny North – St Patrick's Athletic, Sligo Rovers, Shamrock Rovers
 Colum Nugent – Waterford
 Scott Oakes – Shelbourne
 Eric Odhiambo – Sligo Rovers
 Akin Odimayo – Waterford
 Junior Ogedi-Uzokwe – Derry City, Sligo Rovers, Dundalk, Bohemians
 Neil Ogden – Sligo Rovers, Shelbourne, Galway United
 Sam Oji – Limerick, Galway United
 Joseph Olowu – Cork City
 Stuart Parker – Drogheda United
 Will Patching – Dundalk, Derry City
 Greg Peel – Waterford
 Evan Pierce – Athlone Town
 Derek Possee – St Patrick's Athletic
 Vill Powell – Derry City
 Sam Ramsbottom – Galway United
 Mark Rees – Shamrock Rovers
 Nicky Reid – Sligo Rovers
 Jordan Richards – Sligo Rovers
 Rohan Ricketts – Shamrock Rovers
 Daryl Robson – Galway United, Bray Wanderers
 Craig Roddan – Sligo Rovers
 Dave Rogers – Shelbourne, Derry City, St Patrick's Athletic, Sporting Fingal, Dundalk, Cork City, Limerick, Monaghan United, Drogheda United, Bohemians
 Bradley Rolt – Bohemians
 Richard Rose – Longford Town
 Adam Rundle – Dublin City, Cork City
 Mark Rutherford – Shelbourne, Bohemians, Shamrock Rovers, St Patrick's Athletic, Longford Town
 Alex Rutter – Galway United
 Darragh Ryan – UCD, Cork City, St Patrick's Athletic
 Bill Sampy – Waterford
 Lawrie Sanchez – Sligo Rovers
 Cameron Saul – Finn Harps
 Danny Seaborne – Derry City
 Jack Serrant-Green – Finn Harps
 Peter Shevlin – Shelbourne
 Aaron Simpson – Waterford
 Connor Simpson – Cork City
 Harpal Singh – Sligo Rovers, Bohemians, Dundalk
 Mike Skivington – Dundalk
 Dan Smith – Cork City
 David Smith – Drogheda United
 Tom Smith – Waterford
 Danny Spiller – Longford Town
 Kyron Stabana – Cork City
 Jack Stafford – Waterford
 Matty Stevens – Sligo Rovers
 Bobby Tambling – Cork Celtic, Waterford, Shamrock Rovers, Cork Alberts
 Richard Taylor – Waterford
 Remi Thompson – Waterford
 James Tilley – Cork City
 Rayhaan Tulloch – Dundalk
 Mike Turner – Finn Harps
 Scott Twine – Waterford
 Terry Venables – St Patrick's Athletic
 Danny Ventre – Sligo Rovers, Derry City
 Mickey Walker – Sligo Rovers
 Ray Wallace – Drogheda United
 Sid Wallace – Waterford
 Dan Ward – St Patrick's Athletic
 Niall Watson – Sligo Rovers
 Vinny Whelan – Shelbourne
 Lee Williams – Shamrock Rovers
 Robbie Williams – Limerick, Cork City, Galway United
 Wasiri Williams – Dundalk
 Tony Witter – Bohemians
 Anthony Wordsworth – Waterford
 Andre Wright – Bohemians, Sligo Rovers
 Ollie Younger – St Patrick's Athletic

Estonia
 Sander Puri – Sligo Rovers, Waterford
 Vladislav Kreida – St Patrick's Athletic
 Frank Liivak – Sligo Rovers
 Markus Poom – Shamrock Rovers
 Bogdan Vaštšuk – Sligo Rovers

Faroe Islands
 Sonni Nattestad – Dundalk
 Stefan Radosavljevic – Sligo Rovers

Finland
 Jonas Häkkinen – Cork City
 Hugo Keto – Waterford
 Lasse Peltonen – UCD
 Teemu Penninkangas – Sligo Rovers
 Sami Ristilä – Drogheda United
 Tomi Saarelma – Galway United
 Mikko Vilmunen – Drogheda United
 Johannes Yli-Kokko – Dundalk

France
 Maxime Blanchard – Shamrock Rovers
 Achille Campion – Sligo Rovers, Cork City, St Patrick's Athletic
 Damien Dupuy – UCD, Galway United
 Vincent Escudé-Candau – Cork City
 Stephane Jauny – Dundalk, Home Farm
 Ibrahim Keita – Finn Harps, Galway United
 Osvaldo Lopes – Cork City
 Etanda N'Kololo – Salthill Devon, Mervue United, Longford Town, Athlone Town
 Élie N'Zeyi - Finn Harps
 Yann M'Vita – Longford Town
 Christophe Rodrigues Silva – Athlone Town
 Gianni Seraf – Derry City
 Wilfried Tagbo – Finn Harps
 Isaac Tshipamba – Waterford
 Pascal Vaudequin – Derry City, Shelbourne, Finn Harps, Bohemians, Shamrock Rovers
 Mickaël Wolski – Shamrock Rovers

Georgia
 Nika Kalandarishvili – Athlone Town, Cabinteely

Germany
 Eric Abulu – Shamrock Rovers, Longford Town
 Laurenz Dehl – Bohemians
 Fabrice Hartmann – Sligo Rovers
 Tim Hiemer – Finn Harps
 Franz-Josef Hönig – Cork Celtic
 Leon Pöhls – Shamrock Rovers
 Sinisa Savic – Longford Town
 Uwe Seeler – Cork Celtic

Gibraltar
 Louie Annesley – Dundalk

Hungary
 Krisztián Adorján – Dundalk
 Peter Berki – Limerick
 Róbert Kovácsevics – Drogheda United

Israel
 Alon Netzer – Derry City

Italy
 Luciano Masiello – Athlone Town
 Christian Nanetti – Cork City
 Vito Tamburro – Cabinteely

Latvia
 Gints Freimanis – St Patrick's Athletic
 Kirils Grigorovs – Athlone Town
 Raivis Jurkovskis – Dundalk
 Igors Labuts – Sporting Fingal, Athlone Town
 Roberts Mežeckis – Cork City
 Andrejs Perepļotkins – Bohemians
 Renārs Rode – Waterford
 Guntars Silagailis – Cork City
 David Titov – St Patrick's Athletic

Lithuania
 Arminas Balevicius – Waterford United
 Karolis Chvedukas – Dundalk, Waterford
 Mindaugas Kalonas – Bohemians
 Vilius Labutis – Cabinteely, Bray Wanderers
 Danielus Niekis – Wexford Youths
 Sigitas Olberkis – Sligo Rovers
 Rimvydas Sadauskas – Cork City
 Nazar Zubkov – Athlone Town

Malta
 Jacob Borg – Finn Harps
 Luke Dimech – Shamrock Rovers
 Kyrian Nwoko – St Patrick's Athletic

Moldova
 Dragos Mamaliga – Bray Wanderers
 Eugen Slivca – Athlone Town

Netherlands
 Jordi Balk – St Patrick's Athletic
 Youri Habing – Athlone Town
 Noah Lewis – St Patrick's Athletic
 Barry Maguire – Limerick
 Quincy Nkansah – Athlone Town
 Regillio Nooitmeer – Galway United
 John Powell – Shelbourne, Drogheda United
 Jermaine Sandvliet – Drogheda United
 Thijs Timmermans – St Patrick's Athletic
 Eddie van Boxtel – Dundalk, Galway United, Drogheda United, Monaghan United, Bray Wanderers
 Carel van der Velden – Shelbourne, Sligo Rovers
 Noah van Geenen – Athlone Town

North Macedonia
 Daniel Krezic – Cork City

Norway
 Stanley Anaebonam – Shelbourne
 Glen Atle Larsen – St Patrick's Athletic
 Ole Erik Midtskogen – Dundalk
 Runar Hauge - Dundalk
 Tim Nilsen – Derry City

Poland
 Piotr Bajdziak – Sligo Rovers
 Jarosław Białek – St Patrick's Athletic
 Piotr Krzanowski – Cork City
 Krystian Lamberski – Waterford
 Arek Mamala – Galway United
 Krystian Nowak – Bohemians
 Kacper Radkowski – Bohemians
 Michal Sadys – Cobh Ramblers
 Łukasz Skowron – St Patrick's Athletic
 Piotr Suski – Waterford
 Marcin Szymański – Galway United

Portugal
 Mauro Almeida – Sligo Rovers
 Dery Hernandez – Athlone Town
 Adalberto Pinto – Shelbourne
 Carlos Rocha – Kilkenny City
 José Viegas – Athlone Town
 Nelson Vieira – Sligo Rovers

Romania
 Victor Collins – Salthill Devon, Galway United
 Andrei Georgescu – Bray Wanderers, Shelbourne, Athlone Town, Drogheda United
 Marco Chindea – St Patrick's Athletic, Waterford, Athlone Town, Bohemians
 Cristian Magerusan – Bohemians
 Bogdan Oprea – UCD
 Gabriel Sava – Bray Wanderers, Drohgheda United, Monaghan United, Dundalk
 Dragoș Sfrijan – Athlone Town

Scotland
 Jordan Allan – Derry City
 Scott Allardice – Bohemians, Waterford
 Chris Bennion – Shelbourne, Dundalk, Athlone Town, St Patrick's Athletic, Monaghan United, Longford Town
 Steven Bradley – Dundalk
 Liam Buchanan – Sligo Rovers
 Francis Burns – Shamrock Rovers
 Liam Burt – Bohemians, Shamrock Rovers
 Tommy Callaghan – Galway Rovers
 Colin Cameron – Sligo Rovers
 Greg Cameron – Shamrock Rovers
 Chic Charnley – Cork City
 Peter Cherrie – Dundalk, Bray Wanderers, Cork City, Derry City
 Ross Chisholm – Shamrock Rovers
 Darren Cole – Derry City
 John Colrain – St Patrick's Athletic
 Alex Cooper – Sligo Rovers
 Ali Coote – Waterford, Bohemians
 James Creaney – Dundalk, Galway United
 Dixie Deans – Shelbourne
 Kevin Docherty – Finn Harps
 Cameron Elliott – Dundalk
 Kyle Ferguson – Waterford
 Billy Findlay – Sligo Rovers
 Danny Galbraith – Limerick
 Stuart Gauld – St Patrick's Athletic, Derry City, Finn Harps
 Billy Gibson – St Patrick's Athletic
 John Gibson – Sligo Rovers
 Ally Gilchrist – Shamrock Rovers, Derry City, Shelbourne, Cork City
 Grant Gillespie – Derry City
 Ian Gilzean – Sligo Rovers, Drogheda United, St Patrick's Athletic, Shelbourne
 Declan Glass – Derry City
 Dale Gray – Sligo Rovers
 Stewart Greacen – Derry City
 Martin Gritton – Shelbourne
 Alex Hair – Shelbourne
 David Herd – Waterford
 David Hopkirk – Derry City
 Max Hutchison – Waterford
 Jimmy Johnstone – Shelbourne
 Robert Jones – Finn Harps
 Josh Kerr – Derry City, Bohemians
 Billy King – St Patrick's Athletic
 Cameron King – Shamrock Rovers
 Jim Lauchlan – Sligo Rovers
 Steven Lennon – Dundalk
 Sam Long – Drogheda United
 Nicky Low – Derry City
 Lewis Macari – Dundalk
 Stephen Manson – Sligo Rovers
 Neil Martin – St Patrick's Athletic
 Alex Massie – Dolphin
 John Paul McBride – Derry City
 Rhys McCabe – Sligo Rovers, St Patrick's Athletic
 Vinny McCarthy – Waterford, Shamrock Rovers, Cobh Ramblers
 Allan McClory – Brideville
 Pat McCluskey – Sligo Rovers
 John McCole – Shelbourne, Cork Hibernians, Dundalk
 Jon McCracken – Bohemians
 Marc McCulloch – Shelbourne, Galway United
 Declan McDaid – Bohemians
 Patrick McDonagh – Sligo Rovers
 Kevin McDonald – Drogheda United
 John McFarlane – Shelbourne
 Tommy McGrain – Galway Rovers, Sligo Rovers
 Jon-Paul McGovern – Derry City
 Thomas McGunnigle – Cork
 Kevin McHattie – Derry City
 Jim McInally – Sligo Rovers
 Joe McKee – Dundalk
 Jamie McKenzie – Sligo Rovers, Galway United
 Kevin McKinlay – Dundalk
 Brian McLaughlin – Finn Harps
 Gerry McLoughlin – Waterford United
 Tam McManus – Derry City, Limerick
 Gary McPhee – St Patrick's Athletic
 Willie McStay – Sligo Rovers
 Harry Monaghan – Derry City
 Jordan Moore – Limerick
 Lewis Morrison – Sligo Rovers
 Harry Nicolson – Finn Harps
 Keigan Parker – Cork City
 Jim Paterson – Shamrock Rovers
 Phoenix Patterson – Waterford
 Martin Rennie – St Patrick's Athletic
 Mark Roberts – Shelbourne
 Paul Rudden – Waterford
 Mark Russell – Finn Harps, Galway United
 Ryan Shanley – Finn Harps
 Craig Sives – Shamrock Rovers
 Mike Skivington – Dundalk
 Cammy Smith – Dundalk
 Gordon Smith – Drumcondra
 Matty Smith – Waterford, St Patrick's Athletic, Derry City, Shelbourne
 Aaron Splaine – Derry City
 Sam Stanton – Dundalk
 Mark Stewart – Derry City
 Jered Stirling – Waterford United
 Stuart Taylor – Drogheda United
 Joe Thompson – Derry City
 Jonathan Tiffoney – Limerick
 Gary Twigg – Shamrock Rovers
 Rab Walls – Waterford
 Tom Walsh – Limerick
 Calum Waters – Sligo Rovers
 Tony Weldon – Dundalk
 Alex Williams – Dundalk, St Patrick's Athletic
 Cameron Yates – Dundalk

Serbia
 Aleksandar Krstić – Derry City
 Stefan Čolović – Dundalk

Slovakia
 Jozef Dolný – Derry City
 Róbert Klučiar – Limerick

Slovenia
 Uros Hojan – Cork City

Spain
 Alvarito – Shelbourne
 Guillermo Amirall – Bray Wanderers
 Félix Bape – Athlone Town
 Javier Barba – Galway United
 Alberto Cabanyes – Galway United
 José Carrillo - Finn Harps
 Cristian Castells – Derry City
 José García – Galway United
 Manu Dimas – Galway United
 Yael Haro – Drogheda United, UCD
 Charles Ondo – Waterford
 Diego Portilla – Galway United
 Pablo Rodríguez – Bray Wanderers
 Manu Tejero – Shelbourne
 Raúl Uche – Waterford

Sweden
 Armin Aganovic – Galway United, Derry City
 Kemajl Avdiu – Finn Harps
 Johan Brannefalk – Sligo Rovers
 Kevin Čustović – Cork City
 Markus Gustavsson – Cobh Ramblers
 Oscar Jansson – Shamrock Rovers
 Axel Sjöberg – St Patrick's Athletic
 Ola Tidman – Derry City
 Albin Winbo – Cork City

Switzerland
 Maxime Vuille – Shamrock Rovers B

Turkey
 Erol Erdal Alkan – Finn Harps
 Emre Topçu – Drogheda United

Ukraine
 Valeriy Dolya – Athlone Town
 Viktor Serdeniuk – Shamrock Rovers, Longford Town

Wales
 Joe Adams – Dundalk
 Tony Bird – St Patrick's Athletic, Drogheda United
 Robbie Burton – Sligo Rovers
 Jamie Egan – Cabinteely
 Cameron Evans – Waterford
 Brian Flynn – Limerick City
 Jamie Harris – Bohemians, St Patrick's Athletic, Shelbourne, Drogheda United
 Dan Hawkins – Finn Harps, Shelbourne
 Trevor Hockey – Athlone Town
 David Partridge – St Patrick's Athletic
 Christian Roberts – Drogheda United
 Wayne Russell – Bohemians, Derry City, Waterford United
 Nathan Shepperd – Dundalk
 Dai Thomas – Drogheda United
 Matthew Tipton – Dundalk
 Scott van der Sluis – Shelbourne
 James Waite – Waterford
 Lewis Webb – Shelbourne
 Daniel Williams – Dundalk
 Steve Williams – Dundalk, Shelbourne, Bray Wanderers, Sporting Fingal, Drogheda United

Yugoslavia
 Aleksandar Krstić – Derry City

North and Central America, Caribbean (CONCACAF)

Bahamas
 Ronaldo Green – Waterford

Barbados
 Eric Lavine – Galway United, Longford Town, Athlone Town
 Ryan Lucas – Galway United
 Llewellyn Riley – Galway United, Sligo Rovers
 Alvin Rouse – Sligo Rovers, Monaghan United, Galway United, Longford Town
 Luther Watson – Galway United

Bermuda
 Freddy Hall – Limerick
 Dante Leverock – Sligo Rovers

Canada
 Tomer Chencinski – Shamrock Rovers
 Jeff Clarke – St Patrick's Athletic, Longford Town
 Tyson Farago – St Patrick's Athletic
 Graham Fisher – Finn Harps
 Ben Fisk – Derry City
 Jordan Hamilton – Sligo Rovers
 Joseph Jackson – Drogheda United
 David Norman – UCD
 Terique Mohammed – Dundalk, Athlone Town
 Dylan Sacramento – Galway United
 Kosovar Sadiki – Finn Harps
 Matthew Srbely – Cork City
 Kris Twardek – Sligo Rovers, Bohemians

Curaçao
 Raymond Roos – Kilkenny City

El Salvador
 German Fuentes Rodriguez – Athlone Town

Haiti
 Pascal Millien – Sligo Rovers, Finn Harps
 Frantz Pierrot – Athlone Town

Jamaica
 Dwight Barnett – Dundalk
 Michael Hector – Dundalk
 Ryan Thompson – Shamrock Rovers
 Romeo Parkes – Sligo Rovers

Mexico
 David Alejandro Rojina – Bray Wanderers

Montserrat
 Kaleem Simon – UCD, Longford Town, Bohemians, Cabinteely, Athlone Town, Wexford, Drogheda United

Puerto Rico
 Kupono Low – Sligo Rovers

Saint Kitts and Nevis
 Andre Burley – Waterford
 Michael Crawford – Bohemians
 Austin Huggins – Bohemians

Saint Vincent and the Grenadines
 Wesley Charles – Sligo Rovers, Bray Wanderers, Galway United
 Rodney Jack – Waterford
 Marlon James – Bray Wanderers

Trinidad and Tobago
 Daniel Carr – Shamrock Rovers, Shelbourne
 Avery John – Bohemians, Shelbourne, Longford Town
 Derek Phillips – Derry City, Shamrock Rovers

United States
 Jon Akin – Kilkenny City
 Nicky Broujos – Bray Wanderers, Shelbourne, St Patrick's Athletic, Sligo Rovers
 Vincent Borden – Galway United
 Jamar Campion-Hinds – Athlone Town
 Max Cream – Wexford Youths
 Luke Dennison – Longford Town, Galway United, Bohemians
 David D'Errico – Dundalk
 Taner Dogan – Dundalk, Athlone Town
 Shane Doherty – Galway United
 Jamie Duffy – Kilkenny City, Shamrock Rovers, Longford Town, Dundalk, Drogheda United
 Ryan Flood – Finn Harps
 Lance Friesz – St Patrick's Athletic
 Kevin Garcia – Galway United
 Josh Gatt – Dundalk
 Ed Greene – Shamrock Rovers
 Patrick Hickey – Athlone Town
 Kevin Jones – Shelbourne
 Jake Keegan – Galway United, St Patrick's Athletic
 Brendan King – Bray Wanderers
 Chris Konopka – Sporting Fingal, Waterford
 Morgan Langley – St Patrick's Athletic
 Matthew Leal – Athlone Town
 Isaie Louis – Athlone Town
 Patrick McCann – Finn Harps, Sligo Rovers
 Andrew McConville – Monaghan United
 Rory McCullough – Athlone Town
 Ed McIlvenny – Waterford United
 Eric McWoods – Finn Harps
 Kirk Miller – Galway United
 Matt Nelson – Kilkenny City
 Ciaran Nugent – Sligo Rovers, Galway United
 Ata Ozbay – Finn Harps
 Russell Payne – Derry City, Shamrock Rovers
 Jesús Pérez – Dundalk
 Giles Phillips – Waterford
 Charles Sanders – Waterford United
 Will Seymore – Sligo Rovers, Finn Harps
 Bobby Smith – Dundalk
 Joshua Smith – Finn Harps, Galway United
 Matthew Taylor – Shelbourne
 Oliver White – Cabinteely
 Shane Watkins – Galway United
 Jamesun Wunsch – Limerick

South America (CONMEBOL)

Argentina
 Santiago Falbo – Bohemians
 Ivan Gamarra – Galway United
 Juan Sara – Shelbourne
 Gerardo Bruna – Derry City, Shelbourne

Brazil
 David da Silva – Shelbourne
 Filip Da Silva – Finn Harps
 Luís Sacilotto – St Patrick's Athletic
 Rodrigo Tosi – Limerick
 Pablo Cavalcante – Dundalk
 Eduardo Pincelli – Sligo Rovers
 Hernany Macedo Marques – Dundalk, St Patrick's Athletic

Chile
 Lawrence Vigouroux – Waterford

Uruguay
 Héctor Acuña – Shelbourne
 Walter Invernizzi – Athlone Town

Oceania (OFC)

New Zealand
 Jason Batty – Bohemians
 Che Bunce – Drogheda United
 Sean Byrne – St Patrick's Athletic, Dundalk
 Henry Cameron – Limerick
 Billy de Graaf – Shelbourne
 Raf de Gregorio – Bohemians
 Ryan De Vries – Sligo Rovers
 Dean Dodds – Bohemians
 Lee Jones – Drogheda United
 Max Mata – Sligo Rovers
 Heremaia Ngata – Bohemians
 Nando Pijnaker – Sligo Rovers
 Adam Thomas – Shelbourne, Galway United
 Gavin Wilkinson – Kilkenny City
 Darren Young – Limerick, Waterford United, Athlone Town, Mervue United

References

League of Ireland players
Ireland
Association football player non-biographical articles
Expatriate association footballers in the Republic of Ireland